Corneliu M. Popescu (May 16, 1958 - March 4, 1977) was a Romanian translator of poetry who died at the age of 18 in the earthquake of 1977.

A poetry translation prize was established in 2003 in commemoration of his work. Called the Popescu Prize, it is awarded bi-annually by the Poetry Society 'for poetry translated from a European language into English'. In the Guardian Review on 20 September 2003, there appeared an article by the poet Alan Brownjohn about his own participation in judging the award for that year. A segment of a translation Popescu made of one of Mihai Eminescu's poems is reproduced in the article, as is a photograph of Popescu.

References

1958 births
1977 deaths
Romanian male poets
Romanian translators
Victims of the 1977 Vrancea earthquake
20th-century translators
20th-century Romanian poets
20th-century Romanian male writers